Polypodium ensiforme is a species of fern.

Description

Range

Habitat

Taxonomy

References

ensiforme